Elizabeth Manners, 15th Baroness Ros of Helmsley (c. January 1574 or 1575 – 19 May 1591) was the daughter and heir of Edward Manners, 3rd Earl of Rutland. On her father's death the Earldom of Rutland devolved upon his brother, the Barony of Ros passed to his daughter, Elizabeth.

In January 1589, aged around 14 or 15, she married, at Newark Castle, William Cecil, Lord Burghley, son of Thomas Cecil, 1st Earl of Exeter and Dorothy Neville, daughter of John Nevill, 4th Baron Latimer. Lord Burghley later succeeded as 2nd Earl. She died in childbirth, in London, at Tower Street, All Hallows, Barking and was buried in Westminster Abbey. She was succeeded in the Barony of Ros by her son, William.

References

1570s births
1591 deaths
Year of birth uncertain
16
Hereditary women peers
Daughters of British earls
Deaths in childbirth
Elizabeth Cecil
16th-century English women
16th-century English nobility
English baronesses